Todd Ritter, also known under the nom de plume of Riley Sager and Alan Finn, is an American author of thriller novels.

Biography 
Ritter grew up in a ranch-style house in Pennsylvania. Before becoming a full-time novelist Ritter worked as a journalist, editor and graphic designer.

Writing career 
As of 2022 Ritter has released six novels as Sager and three novels under his real name, the latter of which make up the Kat Campbell series. Ritter has also released one novel under the penname Alan Finn, Things Half in Shadow. He referenced the choice to write under the name Sager, stating that "since we were looking for a new publisher, one could argue that editors would be willing to go with someone who had a clean slate, rather than a critically acclaimed author with a spotty sales record." The author's website for "Riley Sager" initially lacked an author photo or any gender identifying language, including pronouns. This has since changed, as the current website features a photo of Ritter and uses male pronouns.

Bibliography

As Riley Sager 

 Final Girls (2017)
 The Last Time I Lied (2018)
 Lock Every Door (2019)
 Home Before Dark (2020)
Survive the Night (2021)
The House Across the Lake (2022)

As Todd Ritter

Kat Campbell series
 Death Notice (2010)
 Bad Moon (2011, also released as Death Falls)
 Devil's Night (2013, also released as Death Night)

As Alan Finn 

 Things Half in Shadow (2014)

References

External links
 

Living people
Writers from Pennsylvania
American thriller writers
Pseudonymous writers
Year of birth missing (living people)